This is a list of mammals of the Northern Territory of Australia:

The following tags are used to highlight each species' conservation status as assessed by the International Union for Conservation of Nature:

Some species were assessed using an earlier set of criteria. Species assessed using this system have the following instead of near threatened and least concern categories:

Subclass: Eutheria

Order: Artiodactyla
 Family: Cervidae
 Genus: Rusa
 Javan rusa, Rusa timorensis VU introduced
 Family: Suidae
 Genus: Sus
 Wild boar, Sus scrofa LC introduced

Order: Carnivora
 Family: Canidae
 Genus: Canis
 Dingo, Canis lupus dingo 
 Genus: Vulpes
 Red fox, Vulpes vulpes LC introduced

Order: Cetacea
 Suborder: Mysticeti
 Family Balaenopteridae
 Genus: Balaenoptera
 Common minke whale, Balaenoptera acutorostrata LC
 Sei whale, Balaenoptera borealis EN
 Bryde's whale, Balaenoptera edeni DD
 Blue whale, Balaenoptera musculus EN
 Fin whale, Balaenoptera physalus EN
 Genus: Megaptera
 Humpback whale, Megaptera novaeangliae LC
 Suborder: Odontoceti
 Family: Delphinidae
 Genus: Delphinus
 Short-beaked common dolphin, Delphinus delphis LC
 Genus: Feresa
 Pygmy killer whale, Feresa attenuata DD
 Genus: Globicephala
 Short-finned pilot whale, Globicephala macrorhynchus DD
 Genus: Grampus
 Risso's dolphin, Grampus griseus LC
 Genus: Orcaella
 Irrawaddy dolphin, Orcaella brevirostris VU
 Genus: Orcinus
 Killer whale, Orcinus orca DD
 Genus: Peponocephala
 Melon-headed whale, Peponocephala electra LC
 Genus: Physeter
 Sperm whale, Physeter macrocephalus VU
 Genus: Pseudorca
 False killer whale, Pseudorca crassidens DD
 Genus: Sousa
 Chinese white dolphin, Sousa chinensis NT
 Genus: Stenella
 Pantropical spotted dolphin, Stenella attenuata LC
 Striped dolphin, Stenella coeruleoalba LC
 Spinner dolphin, Stenella longgirostris DD
 Genus: Steno
 Rough-toothed dolphin, Steno bredanensis LC
 Genus: Tursiops
 Common bottlenose dolphin, Tursiops truncatus LC
 Family: Kogiidae
 Genus: Kogia
 Pygmy sperm whale, Kogia breviceps DD
 Dwarf sperm whale, Kogia sima DD
 Family: Ziphidae
 Genus: Mesoplodon
 Strap-toothed whale, Mesoplodon layardii DD
 Genus: Ziphius
 Cuvier's beaked whale, Ziphius cavirostris LC

Order: Chiroptera
 Family: Emballonuridae
 Genus: Saccolaimus
 Yellow-bellied sheath-tailed bat, Saccolaimus flaviventris LR/nt
 Naked-rumped pouched bat, Saccolaimus saccolaimus LC
 Genus: Taphozous
 Common sheath-tailed bat, Taphozous georgianus LR/lc
 Hill's sheath-tailed bat, Taphozous hilli LR/lc
 Arnhem sheath-tailed bat, Taphozous kapalgensis LR/lc
 Family: Hipposideridae
 Genus: Hipposideros
 Dusky leaf-nosed bat, Hipposideros ater LR/lc
 Arnhem leaf-nosed bat, Hipposideros iornatus VU
 Northern leaf-nosed bat, Hipposideros stenotis LR/nt
 Genus: Rhinonicteris
 Orange leaf-nosed bat, Rhinonicteris aurantia LC
 Family: Megadermatidae
 Genus: Macroderma
 Ghost bat, Macroderma gigas VU
 Family: Macroglossinae
 Genus: Macroglossus
 Long-tongued nectar bat, Macroglossus minimus LR/lc
 Family: Molossidae
 Genus: Mormopterus
 Beccari's free-tailed bat, Mormopterus beccarii LC
 Little northern freetail bat, Mormopterus loriae
 Hairy-nosed freetail bat, Mormopterus sp. 6
 Inland freetail bat, Mormopterus sp. 3
 Genus: Tadarida
 White-striped free-tailed bat, Tadarida australis LC
 Family: Pteropodidae
 Genus: Pteropus
 Black flying fox, Pteropus alecto LC
 Little red flying fox, Pteropus scapulatus LC
 Family: Vespertilionidae
 Genus: Chalinolobus
 Gould's wattled bat, Chalinolobus gouldii LC
 Chocolate wattled bat, Chalinolobus morio LC
 Hoary wattled bat, Chalinolobus nigrogriseus LR/lc
 Genus: Miniopterus
 Common bent-wing bat, Miniopterus schreibersii CD
 Genus: Myotis
 Northern large-footed bat, Myotis moluccarum
 Genus: Nyctophilus
 Northern long-eared bat, Nyctophilus arnhemensis LC
 Eastern long-eared bat, Nyctophilus bifax LC
 Lesser long-eared bat, Nyctophilus geoffroyi LC
 Pygmy long-eared bat, Nyctophilus walkeri LC
 Genus: Pipistrellus
 Forest pipistrelle, Pipistrellus adamsi LC
 Northern pipistrelle, Pipistrellus westralis LR/lc
 Genus: Scotorepens
 Inland broad-nosed bat, Scotorepens balstoni LC
 Little broad-nosed bat, Scotorepens greyii LC
 Northern broad-nosed bat, Scotorepens sanborni LR/lc
 Genus: Vespadelus
 Inland forest bat, Vespadelus baverstocki LR/lc
 Northern cave bat, Vespadelus caurinus LC
 Finlayson's cave bat, Vespadelus finlaysoni LC

Order: Lagomorpha
 Family: Leporidae
 Genus: Oryctolagus
 European rabbit, Oryctolagus cuniculus EN introduced

Order: Rodentia
 Family: Muridae
 Genus: Conilurus
 Conilurus penicillatus
 Genus: Hydromys
 Rakali, Hydromys chrysogaster LC
 Genus: Leggadina
 Forrest's mouse, Leggadina forresti LC
 Lakeland Downs mouse, Leggadina lakedownensis LC
 Genus: Leporillus
 Lesser stick-nest rat, Leporillus apicalis CR
 Genus: Melomys
 Grassland mosaic-tailed rat, Melomys burtoni LC
 Genus: Mesembriomys
 Black-footed tree-rat, Mesembriomys gouldii NT
 Golden-backed tree-rat, Mesembriomys macrurus LC
 Genus: Mus
 House mouse, Mus musculus LC introduced
 Genus: Notomys
 Spinifex hopping mouse, Notomys alexis LC
 Short-tailed hopping mouse, Notomys amplus EX
 Northern hopping mouse, Notomys aquilo EN
 Fawn hopping mouse, Notomys cervinus VU
 Dusky hopping mouse, Notomys fuscus VU
 Long-tailed hopping mouse, Notomys longicaudatus EX
 Genus: Pseudomys
 Plains rat, Pseudomys australis VU
 Kakadu pebble-mound mouse, Pseudomys calabyi
 Little native mouse, Pseudomys delicatulus LC
 Desert mouse, Pseudomys desertor LR/nt
 Shark Bay mouse, Pseudomys fieldi VU
 Sandy inland mouse, Pseudomys hermannburgensis LR/lc
 Central pebble-mound mouse, Pseudomys johnsoni LR/nt
 Western chestnut mouse, Pseudomys nanus LR/nt
 Genus: Rattus
 Brown rat, Rattus norvegicus LC introduced
 Black rat, Rattus rattus LC introduced
 Dusky field rat, Rattus sordidus LR/nt
 Pale field rat, Rattus tunneyi LR/nt
 Long-haired rat, Rattus villosissimus LC
 Genus: Xeromys
 False water rat, Xeromys myoides VU
 Genus: Zyzomys
 Common rock rat, Zyzomys argurus LR/lc
 Arnhem Land rock rat, Zyzomys maini LR/lc
 Carpentarian rock rat, Zyzomys palatalis CR
 Central rock rat, Zyzomys pedunculatus CR

Order: Sirenia
 Family: Dugongidae
 Genus: Dugong
 Dugong, Dugong dugon VU

Subclass: Metatheria

Order: Dasyuromorphia
 Family: Dasyuridae
 Subfamily: Dasyurinae
 Tribe: Dasyurini
 Genus: Dasycercus
 Crest-tailed mulgara, Dasycercus cristicauda LC
 Brush-tailed mulgara, Dasycercus blythi LC
 Genus: Dasyuroides
 Kowari, Dasyuroides byrnei VU
 Genus: Dasyurus
 Western quoll, Dasyurus geoffroii NT
 Northern quoll, Dasyurus hallucatus EN
 Genus: Pseudantechinus
 Sandstone false antechinus, Pseudantechinus bilarni NT
 Fat-tailed false antechinus, Pseudantechinus macdonnellensis LC
 Alexandria false antechinus, Pseudantechinus mimulus EN
 Ningbing false antechinus, Psuedantechinus ningbing LC
 Tribe: Phascogalini
 Genus: Phascogale
 Red-tailed phascogale, Phascogale calura NT
 Brush-tailed phascogale, Phascogale tapoatafa NT
 Tribe: Sminthopsini
 Genus: Sminthopsis
 Kakadu dunnart, Sminthopsis bindi LC
 Carpentarian dunnart, Sminthopsis butleri VU
 Fat-tailed dunnart, Sminthopsis crassicaudata LC
 Hairy-footed dunnart, Sminthopsis hirtipes LC
 Long-tailed dunnart, Sminthopsis longicaudata LC
 Stripe-faced dunnart, Sminthopsis macroura LC
 Ooldea dunnart, Sminthopsis ooldea LC
 Sandhill dunnart, Sminthopsis psammophila EN
 Red-cheeked dunnart, Sminthopsis virginiae LC
 Lesser hairy-footed dunnart, Sminthopsis youngsoni LC
 Subfamily: Sminthopsinae
 Tribe: Planigalini
 Genus: Planigale
 Paucident planigale, Planigale gilesi LC
 Long-tailed planigale, Planigale ingrami LC
 Common planigale, Planigale maculata LC
 Narrow-nosed planigale, Planigale tenuirostris LC
 Tribe: Sminthopsini
 Genus: Antechinomys
 Kultarr, Antechinomys laniger LC
 Genus: Antechinus
 Fawn antechinus, Antechinus bellus LC
 Genus: Ningaui
 Wongai ningaui, Ningaui ridei LC
 Family: Myrmecobiidae
 Genus: Myrmecobius
 Numbat, Myrmecobius fasciatus EN

Order: Diprotodontia
 Family: Macropodidae
 Genus: Lagorchestes
 Lake Mackay hare-wallaby, Lagorchestes asomatus EX
 Spectacled hare-wallaby, Lagorchestes conspicillatus LC
 Rufous hare-wallaby, Lagorchestes hirsutus VU
 Genus: Notamacropus
 Agile wallaby, N. agilis LC
 Genus: Onychogalea
 Crescent nail-tail wallaby, Onychogalea lunata EX
 Northern nail-tail wallaby, Onychogalea unguifera LC
 Genus: Osphranter
 Antilopine kangaroo, O. antilopinus LC
 Black wallaroo, O. bernadus NT
 Common wallaroo, O. robustus LC
 Red kangaroo, O. rufus LC
 Genus: Petrogale
 Short-eared rock-wallaby, Petrogale brachyotis LC
 Nabarlek, Petrogale concinna DD
 Black-flanked rock-wallaby, Petrogale lateralis NT
 Family: Petauridae
 Genus: Petaurus
 Savanna glider, Petaurus ariel NE
 Family: Potoroidae
 Genus: Bettongia
 Boodie, Bettongia lesueur NT
 Woylie, Bettongia penicillata CR
 Family: Phalangeridae
 Genus: Trichosurus
 Common brushtail possum, Trichosurus vulpecula LC
 Family: Pseudocheiridae
 Genus: Petropseudes
 Rock-haunting ringtail possum, Petropseudes dahli LC

Order: Notoryctemorphia
 Family: Notoryctidae
 Genus: Notoryctes
 Northern marsupial mole, Notoryctes caurinus DD
 Southern marsupial mole, Notoryctes typhlops DD

Order: Peramelemorphia
 Family: †Chaeropodidae
 Genus: †Chaeropus
 Pig-footed bandicoot, Chaeropus ecaudatus EX
 Family: Peramelidae
 Genus: Isoodon
 Golden bandicoot, Isoodon auratus VU
 Northern brown bandicoot, Isoodon macrourus LC
 Genus: Perameles
 Desert bandicoot, Perameles eremiana EX
 Family: Thylacomyidae
 Genus: Macrotis
 Greater bilby, Macrotis lagotis VU
 Lesser bilby, Macrotis leucura EX

Subclass: Prototheria

Order: Monotremata
 Family: Tachyglossidae
 Genus: Tachyglossus
 Short-beaked echidna, Tachyglossus aculeatus LC

References
 https://web.archive.org/web/20080414182116/http://www.nt.gov.au/nreta/wildlife/animals/native/mammals.html

 
Northern Territory
Mammals